Exocyst complex component 8 is a protein that in humans is encoded by the EXOC8 gene.

Interactions 

EXOC8 has been shown to interact with RALB.

References

Further reading